Statue of Junípero Serra may refer to:

 Statue of Junípero Serra (Carmel-by-the-Sea, California), also known as the Serra shrine, by Jo Mora
 Statue of Junípero Serra (Los Angeles), after Ettore Cadorin's statue for the U.S. Capitol
 Statue of Junípero Serra (Monterey, California), by Peter Bisson
 Statue of Junípero Serra (Sacramento, California), by Maurice Loriaux
 Statue of Junípero Serra (San Francisco), by Douglas Tilden
 Statue of Junípero Serra (San Luis Obispo, California), by Dale Smith
 Statue of Junípero Serra (U.S. Capitol), by Ettore Cadorin
 Statues of Junípero Serra (Ventura, California), by John Palo-Kangas